Elnur Allahverdiyev (born 2 November 1983) is a football defender from Azerbaijan who last played for Neftchi Baku. He is also a member of Azerbaijan national football team.

Career
In 2008, Allahverdiyev scored the only goal in Neftchi Baku's 1–0 win against Germinal Beerschot Antwerpen to advance to the third round of Intertoto Cup 2008, where they faced FC Vaslui from Romania.

Gabala
In September 2013, Allahverdiyev joined Gabala on an initial six-month-long loan from Khazar Lankaran. On 8 January, Allahverdiyev made his move to Gabala, signing a one-year deal.

Neftchi Baku Return
On 11 September 2014, after being frozen out of the Gabala team, Allahverdiyev signed a two-year contract with Neftchi Baku. After just four months with Neftchi, Allahverdiyev was released by the club in January 2015.

Career statistics

Club

International

Honours
Qarabağ
Azerbaijan Cup: 2008–09
Khazar Lankaran
Azerbaijan Cup: 2010–11

References

External links
  Player profile on official club website 
 

Living people
1983 births
Azerbaijani footballers
Azerbaijan international footballers
Qarabağ FK players
Turan-Tovuz IK players
Khazar Lankaran FK players
MOIK Baku players
Gabala FC players
Footballers from Baku
Association football defenders
Neftçi PFK players
Azerbaijan Premier League players